Schwanden railway station is a railway station in the municipality of Glarus Süd in the Swiss canton of Glarus. It is an intermediate stop on the Weesen to Linthal railway line, and serves the village of Schwanden. Between 1905 and 1969, the station was the terminus of the Sernftal tramway, a metre gauge tramway that ran up the valley of the Sernf river to Elm, and was the predecessor of the Sernftalbus service on the same route.

The station is served by Zürich S-Bahn service S25 between Zurich and Linthal. It is also the terminus of the St. Gallen S-Bahn service S6 from Rapperswil. Both services operate once per hour, combining to provide two trains per hour between Ziegelbrücke and Schwanden.

Services 
 the following rail services stop at Schwanden:

The station is also the terminus of several connecting bus routes, operated by the Sernftalbus company:

 an hourly service up the valley of the Sernf river to Glarus
 an hourly service to Schwändi
 a service to Sool, with several return journeys a day
 a summer-only service, with several return journeys a day, to connect with an aerial tramway to the Garichtisee.

References

External links 
 
 

Schwanden
Schwanden